Galleons of Glory: The Secret Voyage of Magellan is a 1990 video game published by Broderbund.

Gameplay
Galleons of Glory is a game in which players seek to discover the Straits of Magellan.

Reception
Alan Emrich reviewed the game for Computer Gaming World, and stated that "Broderbund has done a fine job of creating a simple game with plenty of fascinating history for players to learn quite transparently while they enjoy the game's play."

Steven Anzovin for Compute! said that "if you are intrigued by the exploits of 'so noble a captain,' as Magellan's chronicler Antonio Pigafetta called him, take the helm. Galleons of Glory proves to be quite a seaworthy simulation."

Reviews
ASM (Aktueller Software Markt) - Apr, 1991

References

1990 video games
Age of Discovery video games
Cultural depictions of Ferdinand Magellan
DOS games
DOS-only games
Educational video games
Naval video games
Simulation video games
Video games based on real people
Video games developed in the United States
Video games set in South America